Pieter Jan Leeuwerink (10 February 1962 – 27 September 2004) was a Dutch volleyball player. He competed in the men's tournament at the 1988 Summer Olympics.

References

External links
 

1962 births
2004 deaths
Dutch men's volleyball players
Olympic volleyball players of the Netherlands
Volleyball players at the 1988 Summer Olympics
People from Wormerland
Sportspeople from North Holland